71 Nyhavn is a high-end hotel based in two converted warehouses on the corner of the Nyhavn Canal and the main harbourfront of Copenhagen, Denmark. It has 150 rooms and is after an upgrade completed in 2018 Apr-Hansen Hotel Group's most expensive hotel.

History

The building, also known as the Suhr Warehouse, was built in 1805 by Ole Berendt Suhr (1762-1815) and Ludvigsen, his business partner. It was listed in 1918.

In 1971, the building was restored and adapted by the architects Flemming Hertz and O. Ramsgaard Thomsen and converted into a hotel which opened the following year. In 2000, the hotel was extended with the Puggaard Warehouse, a yellow building from about 1850 located on the rear side of the Suhr Warehouse. It was originally used for the storage of spices from the Far East.

Architecture
The building is built in red brick and has 14 bays along Nyhavn and 4 bays along the main harbour front

Today
71 Nyhavn is a four star hotel with a total of 150 rooms and suites. The number of rooms in the red warehouse was reduced from 84 to 64 in connection with the most recent refurbishment of the hotel. The tekkow warehouse contains 66 rooms. Other facilities include a restaurant and a meeting room.

Image gallery

See also
 Arp-Hansen Hotel Group

References

External links

 Arp-Hansen Hotel Group
 Source

Hotels in Copenhagen
Warehouses in Copenhagen
Listed hotels in Copenhagen
Listed warehouses in Denmark
Commercial buildings completed in 1805
1971 establishments in Denmark